Lewis's woodpecker (Melanerpes lewis) is a large North American species of woodpecker which ornithologist Alexander Wilson named after Meriwether Lewis, one of the explorers who surveyed the areas bought by the United States of America as part of the Louisiana Purchase and discovered this species of bird.

Taxonomy
Lewis's woodpecker was described and illustrated in 1811 by the American ornithologist Alexander Wilson in his American Ornithology; or, the Natural History of the Birds of the United States. Wilson based his description on some bird skins that had been collected on an expedition across the western portion of the United States led by Meriwether Lewis and William Clark in 1803–1806. Wilson coined the English name "Lewis's woodpecker" and the binomial name Picus torquatus. Unfortunately, the specific epithet was preoccupied by the ringed woodpecker, Celeus torquatus (Boddaert, 1783) and so in 1849 the English zoologist George Robert Gray coined a new name Picus lewis. The type locality is Montana. Lewis's woodpecker is now placed in the genus Melanerpes that was erected by the English ornithologist William John Swainson in 1832. The species is monotypic: no subspecies are recognised.

Description
It is mainly reddish-breasted, blackish-green in color with a black rump. It has a gray collar and upper breast, with a pinkish belly, and a red face. The wings are much broader than those of other woodpeckers, and it flies at a much more sluggish pace with slow, but even flaps similar to those of a crow. Its calls have a harsh sound relative to other woodpeckers', and it may use a repertoire of several different phrases. They are one of the three largest Melanerpes woodpeckers, being similar in size to the white woodpecker and the Jamaican woodpecker.

Measurements:

 Length: 
 Weight: 
 Wingspan:

Range and habitat
Lewis's woodpecker is locally common, dwelling mostly in open pine woodlands, and other areas with scattered trees and snags. Unlike other American woodpeckers, it enjoys sitting in the open as opposed to sitting in heavy tree cover. It ranges mostly in the western to central United States, but can winter as far south as the US border with Mexico and summer as far north as Canada. It has been seen in five Midwestern states: South Dakota, Michigan, Illinois, Minnesota, and Wisconsin.

Feeding
Lewis's woodpecker engages in some rather un-woodpecker-like behavior in its gregarious feeding habits. Although it does forage for insects by boring into trees with its chisel-like bill, the bird also catches insects in the air during flight (typical insect hawking), a habit that only a few other woodpeckers, such as the Acorn woodpecker, the red-headed woodpecker and the northern flicker, engage in. Lewis's woodpecker also feeds on berries and nuts, and will even shell and store nuts in cracks and holes in wood to store until winter. It will also feed at flat, open bird feeders where it might act aggressively toward other birds.

Breeding
Lewis's woodpecker nests in a cavity excavated from a dead tree branch. The nest is constructed mainly by the male. The female will lay between 5 and 9 eggs, which are plain white in coloration. Both sexes incubate—the female during the day and the male at night. Incubation lasts approximately 12 days, after which the young will hatch. The young leave the nest four to five weeks after hatching.

References

External links

 Lewis's woodpecker - Melanerpes lewis - USGS Patuxent Bird Identification InfoCenter
 Lewis's woodpecker Species Account - Cornell Lab of Ornithology
 Lewis's woodpecker photo gallery VIREO
 Photo-Medium Res; Article w/species analysis dwrcdc.nr.Utah.gov–Utah Division of Wildlife Resources
 Photo-High Res; Article pbase

Lewis's woodpecker
Lewis's woodpecker
Native birds of Western Canada
Native birds of the Western United States
Lewis's woodpecker